The Supreme Cat Show is organised every year by the world's oldest cat registry, the Governing Council of the Cat Fancy, and takes place each October at the National Exhibition Centre (NEC), in Birmingham, England. Special awards of UK Champion and Supreme Champion can be gained at this show only. A contestant cat wins each show's "Best in Show" award.

History
The first Supreme Cat Show took place in 1976. Until then the GCCF itself did not organise cat shows, but licensed shows put on by the breed clubs and area clubs affiliated to it. The Supreme Cat Show was devised as a special show, only open to cats which had won an open class at another championship show under GCCF rules, much in the same way that Crufts is only open to winning dogs. The show grew in size each year until it became big enough to be held at the NEC, which has been its home ever since.

Show structure
Unlike most other shows, the GCCF's Supreme Show has no miscellaneous or club classes; it does, however, have classes other shows do not have. There are four Adult Open classes for each championship status breed: Champion Male and Female classes for full Champions, the winners being eligible for Grand Challenge Certificates and Pre-Champion Male and Female classes for cats with one or two Certificates, competing for Challenge Certificates. The same applies to the neuter classes which are split into Premier and Pre-Premier classes for males and females.

Cats which are already Grand Champions do not compete in these classes but in special classes for Grand Champions, Imperial Grand Champions, UK Grand Champions and UK & Imperial Grand Champions only, the winner being eligible for a UK Grand Challenge Certificate. Grand Premiers, Imperial Grand Premiers, UK Grand Premiers and UK & Imperial Grand Premiers compete for a UK Grand Premier Certificate. In these classes several breeds may compete together. UK Grand Certificates are only awarded at the Supreme Show; two such Certificates from different judges give the cat the title of UK Grand Champion/Premier or UK & Imperial Grand Champion/Premier if it has additionally gained that title. There is no Reserve UK Grand Challenge/Premier Certificate.

Best of Breed winners at the Supreme Show do not get certificates but compete against the other BOB winners in their section for Best of Variety.

The seven Best of Variety Adults (Persian, Semi-Longhair, British, Foreign, Burmese, Oriental and Siamese) compete for Supreme Adult, the seven kittens for Supreme Kitten and the seven neuters for Supreme Neuter. The Supreme Adult and the Neuter can add the coveted word 'Supreme' to their title.

Finally, the Supreme Adult, Supreme Kitten and Supreme Neuter compete against each other for the honour of being judged Supreme Exhibit.

Non-pedigree and pedigree pet cats
Non-pedigree cats (cats of traditional “moggie” appearance) and pedigree pet cats (cats looking like pedigrees with known, unknown, full or half pedigree background) are also permitted to enter the Supreme Cat Show. They can also compete for the same levels of title as the pedigree cats but these are for "Master Cat" titles as opposed to "Champion" and "Premier" ones. They then go on to compete to win the title of Supreme Non-Pedigree or Supreme Pedigree Pet Cat. Classes are also included for kittens, with both non-pedigree and pedigree pet kittens competing for the title of Supreme Household Pet Kitten.

Supreme Best in Show winners

Prior to 1992, there was no individual overall Best in Show Supreme Exhibit. The show was not held in 2020 and 2021 due to the covid-19 pandemic.

Other attractions
Numerous activities take place alongside the competition judging. There are children's activities, such as judging of soft toys, and a large range of stalls selling cat related items, such as cat food, toys, accessories, collectables, books, magazines etc. Various other cat organisations, such as the Feline Advisory Bureau and Cats Protection regularly have information stalls. There is also a large section of the show hall given over to Club Row, where various cat clubs affiliated to the GCCF have stalls where visitors to the show can come and meet the different breeds of cat and obtain information.

See also
Governing Council of the Cat Fancy
Crufts
Cat show

References

External links
Supreme Cat Show website
Governing Council of the Cat Fancy website

1976 establishments in England
Recurring events established in 1976
Annual events in England
Cat shows and showing
Events in the West Midlands (county)
Entertainment in Birmingham, West Midlands
Tourist attractions in Birmingham, West Midlands
Awards to animals